Calliostoma basulense is a species of sea snail, a marine gastropod mollusk, in the family Calliostomatidae within the superfamily Trochoidea, the top snails, turban snails and their allies.

Distribution
This marine species occurs off the Philippines.

References

Three new Calliostoma from the Philippines. Visaya 4(2): 49-56

basulense